The Indian locomotive class WW was a class of 0-6-2T tank locomotives used on  broad gauge lines in India.  The four members of the class were built by Vulcan Foundry in Newton-le-Willows, Lancashire, England, and completed in 1942.

See also

Rail transport in India#History
Indian Railways
Locomotives of India
Rail transport in India

References

Notes

Bibliography

External links

Railway locomotives introduced in 1942
WW
Vulcan Foundry locomotives
0-6-2T locomotives
5 ft 6 in gauge locomotives
Scrapped locomotives